Miho Minei (born 16 September 1997) is a Japanese judoka.

She is the silver medallist of the 2016 Judo Grand Slam Tokyo in the -63 kg category.

References

External links
 

1997 births
Living people
Japanese female judoka
21st-century Japanese women